"Skelewu" is a song by Nigerian singer Davido. It was produced by Shizzi, HKN Music's in-house producer. It peaked at number 1 on Afribiz's Top 100 chart. The song was ranked 5th on Premium Times list of the Top 10 songs of 2013. It gained popularity in Nigeria after Davido announced the Skelewu dance competition. The song was endorsed by African footballers Emmanuel Adebayor and Samuel Eto'o.

"Skelewu" was nominated for Song of the Year at the 2014 MTV Africa Music Awards. It was also nominated for Song of the Year and Best Dance in a Video at the 2014 African Muzik Magazine Awards. The music video for "Skelewu" was nominated for Best Music Video of the Year at the 2014 Nigeria Entertainment Awards, and for Most Gifted Dance at the 2014 Channel O Music Video Awards.

Instructional video and dance competition
Davido promoted "Skelewu" by uploading an instructional dance video to YouTube on 18 August 2013. Directed by Jassy Generation, the video's release was accompanied by an announcement of the Skelewu dance competition. In order to win the competition, participants were told to watch the instructional dance video and upload videos of themselves dancing to the song. According to Pulse Nigeria, the number of dance videos uploaded to YouTube by fans aggregated to over 100,000 views. On 10 October 2013, Davido declared Bello Moshood Abiola the winner of the competition.

Music videos

Releases
There were two music videos released after Davido released the instructional dance video of Skelewu. The first music video, directed by Sesan, was released on 15 October 2013. It was uploaded to YouTube under a parody account. Shortly after its release, fans belittled the video and criticized it for not being up to par. Davido told his fans to disregard the video's unauthorized release. He also said someone betrayed him by releasing it and that he would make another video with Moe Musa, a UK based music video director. In a statement released by his team, Sesan said Davido was satisfied with his contributions to the music video; he also said it would be immature for Davido and his management to release inaccurate statements to defame his brand. 

On 21 October 2013, Davido released the official music video. After the video's release, he received criticism from people who felt it was similar to LMFAO's "Party Rock Anthem" music video. According to Vanguard newspaper, the number of people who disliked the official music video almost equate those who disliked the alternative video. Moe Musa reacted to fans' condemnation of the official video in a negative way. There were reports that Davido wasn't pleased with Moe Musa's video and was looking forward to shooting another music video with Clarence Peters.

Critical reception
The music videos for "Skelewu" received mixed reviews from music critcs. Tosin Ajibade criticized the Sesan-directed music video for piecing together random dance clips. The website Afrobeat360.com praised the Moe Musa-directed video and commended its  setting, location, narrative and choreography.

Accolades

Live performances
On 3 November 2013, Davido performed "Skelewu" at the "Guinness Colourful World of More" concert alongside numerous artists, including P-Square, D'banj, Wizkid, Ice Prince, Burna Boy, Olamide, Phyno, Chidinma, Waje and Tiwa Savage. The concert occurred at the Eko Convention Centre in Victoria Island, Lagos. On 17 December 2013, Davido performed "Skelewu" alongside Burna Boy at the 2013 edition of Carniriv; the festival was held in Port Harcourt at the Liberation Stadium. On 30 December 2013, he performed the song in front of 16,000 people who attended Calabar Rocks, a concert sponsored by the Calabar Carnival Commission.

Track listing and remixes
In April 2014, Major Lazer and Wiwek released an electronic remix of "Skelewu". The music video for the remix compiles various "Skelewu" dance clips from around the world.

Release history

References

External links

2013 singles
2013 songs
Davido songs
Song recordings produced by Shizzi
Songs written by Davido